Shirokoye  ('wide'), rural localities in Russia, may refer to:

 Shirokoye, Arkhangelsk Oblast, a settlement
 Shirokoye, Belgorod Oblast, a selo
 Shirokoye, Kaliningrad Oblast, a settlement
 Shirokoye, Kursk Oblast, a village
 Shirokoye, Orenburg Oblast, a selo
 Shirokoye, Saratov Oblast, a selo
 Shirokoye, Tver Oblast, a village